The 2015–16 USC Upstate Spartans women's basketball team will represent the University of South Carolina Upstate in the 2015–16 NCAA Division I women's basketball season. The Spartans, led by eleventh year head coach Tammy George, played their games at G. B. Hodge Center and are members of the Atlantic Sun Conference. They finished the season 22–12, 10–4 in A-Sun play to finish in third place. They advanced to the semifinals of the A-Sun women's tournament where they lost to Jacksonville. They were invited to the Women's Basketball Invitational where defeated Northern Kentucky in the first round, Western Illinois in the quarterfinals before losing to Weber State in the semifinals.

Media
All home games and conference road will be shown on ESPN3 or A-Sun.TV. Non conference road games will typically be available on the opponents website.

Roster

Schedule

|-
!colspan=9 style="background:#085435; color:#ffffff;"| Non-conference regular season

|-
!colspan=9 style="background:#085435; color:#ffffff;"| Atlantic Sun regular season

|-
!colspan=9 style="background:#085435; color:#ffffff;"| Atlantic Sun Women's Tournament

|-
!colspan=9 style="background:#085435; color:#ffffff;"| WBI

See also
2015–16 USC Upstate Spartans men's basketball team

References

USC Upstate
USC Upstate Spartans women's basketball seasons
USC Upstate
USC Upstate
USC Upstate